Bonnie Nadzam is an American writer. She is a native of Cleveland Heights, Ohio.

Education
She holds a Bachelor of Arts degree in English Literature and Environmental Studies from Carleton College, a Master of Fine Arts from Arizona State University (2004) and an MA and PhD from the University of Southern California (2010).

Career

Her fiction, essays and poetry have appeared in Harper’s, Orion Magazine, Granta, the Kenyon Review, Alaska Quartery Review, and many other journals. Her first novel, Lamb, was recipient of the Center for Fiction First Novel Prize, long-listed for the Baileys Women's Prize for Fiction in the UK, and was translated into several languages.  The book was made into an award-winning independent film, Lamb, starring Ross Partridge and Oona Laurence and produced by Orchard.

Nadzam is co-author of Love in the Anthropocene with environmental ethicist Dale Jamieson. Her second novel, Lions, was released by Grove Atlantic in 2016 and was a Finalist for the PEN USA Literary Award in Fiction.

References

Year of birth missing (living people)
Living people
American women writers
Carleton College alumni
University of Southern California alumni
21st-century American women